Dragomirovo (Cyrillic: Драгомирово) is the name of the following settlements:

Dragomirovo, Pernik Province, Bulgaria
Dragomirovo, Veliko Tarnovo Province, Bulgaria
Dragomirovo, Tajikistan, in Sughd province